Mount Fairweather (officially gazetted as Fairweather Mountain in Canada but referred to as Mount Fairweather), is the highest mountain in the Canadian province of British Columbia, with an elevation of . Most of the mountain lies within Glacier Bay National Park and Preserve in the City and Borough of Yakutat, Alaska (USA), though the summit borders Tatshenshini-Alsek Provincial Park, British Columbia (Canada). It is also designated as Boundary Peak 164 or as US/Canada Boundary Point #164.

The mountain was named on May 3, 1778, by Captain James Cook,  apparently for the unusually good weather encountered at the time. The name has been translated into many languages. It was called "Mt. Beautemps" by La Perouse (1786, atlas), "Mte. Buen-tiempo" by Galiano (1802, map 3), "Gor[a]-Khoroshy-pogody" on Russian Hydrographic Dept. Chart 1378 in 1847, and "G[ora] Fayerveder" by Captain Tebenkov (1852, map 7), Imperial Russian Navy. It was called "Schönwetterberg" by Constantin Grewingk in 1850 and "Schönwetter Berg" by Justus Perthes in 1882.

Fairweather was first climbed in 1931 by Allen Carpé and Terris Moore.

Geography
Mount Fairweather is located right above Glacier Bay in the Fairweather Range of the Saint Elias Mountains. Mount Fairweather also marks the northwest extremity of the Alaska Panhandle.

Like many peaks in the St. Elias Mountains, Mount Fairweather has great vertical relief due to its dramatic rise from Glacier Bay. However, due to poor weather in the area, this effect is usually obscured with the clouds which often hides the summit from view.

Known in the Tlingit language as Tsalxhaan, it is said this mountain and Yaas'éit'aa Shaa (Mt. St. Elias) were originally next to each other but had an argument and separated.  Their children, the mountains in between the two peaks, are called Tsalxhaan Yatx'i (Children of Tsalxaan.)

Weather
Despite its name, Mount Fairweather has generally harsh weather conditions.

Climbing history

No documented attempt at climbing the mountain had been successful until 1931.
 1926 Allen Carpe, Andy Taylor and W.S. Ladd reached  on the West Ridge, but were forced back due to a steep notch in the ridge that made ferrying supplies very difficult.
 1931 Allen Carpe and Terris Moore summited via the Southeast Ridge on June 8, 1931
 1958 Paddy Sherman and 7 other Canadians reached the summit via the SE Ridge on June 26, 1958.
 1968 West Ridge, Loren Adkins, Walter Gove, Paul Myhre, John Neal and Kent Stokes - summit reached June 12, 1968
 1973 Southwest Ridge, Peter Metcalf, Henry Florschutz, Toby O'Brien and Lincoln Stoller.  Summit reached on July 10, 1973.

First Documented Ascent
After failing to reach the summit in 1926 due to terrain difficulty on their chosen route, Allen Carpe, W.S. Ladd, Andy Taylor returned in 1931 along with a new member Terry Moore. In early April the group began their approach by boat but stormy weather delayed them rounding Cape Fairweather until April 17. They reached Lituya Bay and unloaded their supplies on the beach. Backtracking  along the coast, they made their way to the Fairweather Glacier. From base camp in a spot they called Paradise Valley, they decided to attempt the mountain from the south rather than via the west ridge. Due to deep snow, they realized that skis and snowshoes would be of great help so Carpe and Moore made the  round trip to fetch them from Lituya Bay.

On May 25, they established high camp at  after making significant progress up a ridge on a rare day of good weather. However, the weather turned and they were forced to descend after an overnight coating of snow. After waiting out the snowstorm for six days at lower camp, they made their way back up to high camp on June 2. They left for the summit at 1:30 am on June 3 and having reached the southeast shoulder by mid-morning, they were feeling so confident that they left the willow wands behind. However, higher altitude and the weeks of hard effort slowed their progress and then the weather changed. By 1 pm not far from the summit, they decided to retreat and had to descend without the wands to guide them. They managed to reach the tents by 4 pm. Ladd and Taylor volunteered to descend due to dwindling supplies at high camp with the hope that Carpe and Moore would be able to make another attempt in good weather. The storm raged for four days before it finally cleared in the evening on June 7. At 10 pm, Carpe and Moore set out for the summit and with no further difficulties made it to the top.

See also

List of mountain peaks of North America
List of mountain peaks of Canada
List of mountain peaks of the United States
List of Boundary Peaks of the Alaska-British Columbia/Yukon border
NOAA Ship Fairweather

References

Further reading

External links

Landforms of Hoonah–Angoon Census Area, Alaska
Four-thousanders of British Columbia
Mountains of Glacier Bay National Park and Preserve
Saint Elias Mountains
Highest points of United States national parks
Mountains of Yakutat City and Borough, Alaska
Canada–United States border
International mountains of North America
Mount Fairweather
Mountains of Unorganized Borough, Alaska
Cassiar Land District